Poče is a settlement in the hills north of Cerkno in the traditional Littoral region of Slovenia. The name of the settlement is derived from the word poč 'well', which is preserved in the Resian dialect.

References

External links
Poče on Geopedia

Populated places in the Municipality of Cerkno